Bungsberg (originally named Eva, factory body number 646) was a cargo ship built in 1924 at Howaldtswerke in Hamburg, Germany, for China Reederei AG. She had three sister ships:

 Troja - hull no 643 (Deutsche Levante-Linie, Hamburg, 1922)
 Kreta - hull no 644 (Bremer Dampfschiffahrtsgesellschaft, Bremen, 1923)
 Syra - hull no 645 (Deutsche Levante Linie, Hamburg)

Bungsberg was sunk in Tallinn Bay in Estonia on 24 March 1943 by a mine laid by a Soviet airplane. Bungsberg′s last owner was Aug. Bolten Wm Miller's Nachfolger (GmbH & Co.) KG.

Today, Bungsberg′s wreck is a popular dive site for recreational divers. She lies on her keel in an upright position at a depth of 38 meters (125 feet). Her funnel and after mast are missing, as are the upper structures of her bridge. Damage from the mine explosion is clearly visible on her starboard bow. All four of her cargo holds are empty.

Some papers retrieved from Bungsberg′s wreck and her engine order telegraph are kept at the Estonian Maritime Museum in Tallinn, Estonia.

General characteristics 
 Displacement 1,504 tons
 Length: 75,9 m
 Width: 11,6 m
 Triple expansion steam engine

Gallery

External links

Merchant ships of Estonia
Ships built in Hamburg
Ships sunk by mines
Wreck diving sites
Maritime incidents in Estonia
Buildings and structures in Tallinn
Viimsi Parish
1924 ships
Maritime incidents in March 1943
World War II shipwrecks in the Baltic Sea
Shipwrecks in the Gulf of Finland
Ships sunk by Soviet aircraft